Brian Wilks (born February 27, 1966) is a Canadian former professional hockey player who played 48 games for the Los Angeles Kings in the National Hockey League between 1985 and 1988. The rest of his career, which lasted from 1985 to 1990, was spent in the minor leagues.

Biography
Wilks was born in Toronto, Ontario. As a youth, he played in the 1979 Quebec International Pee-Wee Hockey Tournament with the Toronto Shopsy's minor ice hockey team. He attended Carleton University 1990-93, majoring in psychology.

He played for the Kitchener Rangers of the Ontario Hockey League from 1982 to 1984.

He was drafted in 1984, 24th overall, by the Los Angeles Kings. He led the Kings in preseason scoring in 1984-85. He made his NHL debut later that season. He played with the Kings until he was traded to the Edmonton Oilers on March 7, 1989. He never played in the NHL again, and finished his career in the American Hockey League in 1990.

He played for Team Canada in the 1997 Maccabiah Games in Israel, winning a gold medal.

Career statistics

Regular season and playoffs

See also
 List of select Jewish ice hockey players

References

External links
 

1966 births
Living people
Canadian ice hockey centres
Cape Breton Oilers players
Competitors at the 1997 Maccabiah Games
Jewish Canadian sportspeople
Jewish ice hockey players
Kitchener Rangers players
Los Angeles Kings draft picks
Los Angeles Kings players
Maccabiah Games competitors by sport
Maccabiah Games competitors for Canada
Muskegon Lumberjacks players
New Haven Nighthawks players
Ice hockey people from Toronto